Dirt Racer is a Europe-exclusive video game for the Super Nintendo Entertainment System developed by British studio MotiveTime and released in 1995. This game uses the Super FX powered GSU-1 to provide enhanced graphics.

Gameplay

Players must drive their dirt track racing vehicle across a road rally. The car comes complete with a speedometer (in kilometres), a lap counter, and a lap time counter. There are a pre-determined number of chances to complete the game, like in Super Mario Kart and F-Zero. If the player is unable to defeat the game in those number of tries, then the player gets an automatic game over. A yellow smiley face shows up to track the performance of the driver. If it's smiling, then the player is winning. Otherwise, the player is losing the game.

Development and release
Dirt Racer was developed by British studio MotiveTime. It was the second racing game using Super FX technology simultaneously developed under publisher Elite Systems, the other being the unreleased PowerSlide. Dirt Racer programmer Chris Nash and graphic artist Adam Batham stated that development began in September 1993 after they dissected and analyzed the cartridge for Star Fox. They claimed that the updated iteration of the Super FX allowed them to use twice as many polygons as in Star Fox. Unlike the racing game Stunt Race FX, Dirt Racer did not allow to change the viewing perspective because the designers saw it as a needless waste of memory. Elite Systems development manager Trevor Williams explained that the game's race courses were generated on a "square mesh" which could be raised or lowered to create variable terrain. The game's computer AI-controlled opponents were programmed to dynamically adjust to the skill level of the player so that even beginners stand a chance of winning.

Reception 

Dirt Racer received largely negative reviews from print publications during its release including 51% from Super Play, 30% from Total!, and 21% from GamesMaster.

References

External links
 Dirt Racer at MobyGames

1995 video games
Europe-exclusive video games
Rally racing video games
Super Nintendo Entertainment System games
Super Nintendo Entertainment System-only games
Super FX games
Video games developed in the United Kingdom
Video games set in Alaska
Video games set in Australia
Video games set in England